

Births
 Rumi, (died 1273), 13th-century Turkish poet, Islamic jurist, theologian, and mystic.

Deaths
 Xin Qiji (born 1140), Chinese Song Dynasty poet and military leader

References

13th-century poetry
Poetry